Erkki Kohvakka (2 July 1937 – 23 January 2018) was a Finnish orienteering competitor and European champion. He won a gold medal in the individual 1964 European Orienteering Championships in Le Brassus, and also a gold medal with the Finnish relay team. He was also member of the Finnish team that won the relay at the 1962 European championships, while not part of the official program.

He received a silver medal in the relay at the 1966 World Orienteering Championships with the Finnish team.

See also
 Finnish orienteers
 List of orienteers
 List of orienteering events

References

1937 births
2018 deaths
Finnish orienteers
Male orienteers
Foot orienteers
World Orienteering Championships medalists